This article lists actually existing churches in Prague of some historical or artistic value. The first part contains churches in the historical city centre (Hradčany, Malá Strana, Old Town, New Town and Vyšehrad), the second churches in the outer districts (Prague 3 to Prague 10).

Comments 
 Church - short name, patrocinium etc.
 Confession (use) - confession or another use. Brackets indicate, there are no regular services, the building is not regularly accessible.
 Established - date of original creation of the existing building and of substantial reconstruction(s). A „+“ means after, a „-„ means before.
 Style - the prevailing style(s) of the present building.
 Architect - a choice, often merely architects of the reconstructions.

Churches in the historical city center 

Selection and source: P. Vlček a kol., Umělecké památky Prahy I.–IV.

Churches in the outer districts

References

Literature 
 E. Poche a kol., Umělecké památky Čech 1.-4. Praha 1977n.
 P. Vlček a kol., Umělecké památky Prahy I./IV. Praha 1999n.

External links 
 Prague UNESCO Reservation (card)
 Catholic services in Prague
 Evangelical services in Prague